Andrea Sartoretti (born 19 June 1971) is an Italian former volleyball player.

Biography
Born at Perugia, Sartoretti  debuted in the Italian Serie in 1991, winning the Award as best Under 23 player. A 1.94 cm athlete, he usually played opposite hitter.  Sartoretti was known for his powerful serve, which gained him the nickname of Sartorace.

He won one Italian Serie A1 national title in 1997, with Pallavolo Modena. Sartoretti also won three CEV Champions Leagues and two European Supercups in his stay at Messaggero Ravenna (1991-1996).

He earned his first cap for Italy national team in 1993. He won four World Leagues (two times declared MVP), two European (2001 and 2003) and a World (1998) titles.  He has won two silver medals and a bronze medal in three Olympic Games between 1996 and 2004.

Sartoretti ended his playing career in 2009. He is currently part GM of Modena Volley.
Sartoretti 330 apps for national team of Italy.

Clubs

Individual awards

 2000 World League "Most Valuable Player"
 2003 European Championship "Most Valuable Player"
 2003 European Championship "Best Server"
 2003 FIVB World Cup "Best Server"
 2004 Summer Olympics "Best Server"
 2004 Summer Olympics "Best Scorer"
 2004 World League "Most Valuable Player"

State awards
 2000  Knight's Order of Merit of the Italian Republic
 2004  Officer's Order of Merit of the Italian Republic

References

External links 
 
 

1971 births
Living people
Sportspeople from Perugia
Olympic volleyball players of Italy
Italian men's volleyball players
Volleyball players at the 1996 Summer Olympics
Volleyball players at the 2000 Summer Olympics
Volleyball players at the 2004 Summer Olympics
Olympic bronze medalists for Italy
Olympic silver medalists for Italy
Olympic medalists in volleyball
Medalists at the 2004 Summer Olympics
Medalists at the 2000 Summer Olympics
Medalists at the 1996 Summer Olympics
Universiade medalists in volleyball
Universiade bronze medalists for Italy
Medalists at the 1995 Summer Universiade